Thomas Jessayyan Netto (born 29 December 1964) is the Archbishop of the Roman Catholic Archdiocese of Trivandrum. Archbishop Netto is the second Archbishop of Thiruvananthapuram archdiocese.

Biography
Thomas J. Netto was born in Puthiyathura in the Archdiocese of Trivandrum on December 29, 1964, and was ordained as a priest there on December 19, 1989. He completed his studies in philosophy and theology at Saint Joseph's Pontifical Seminary in Alwaye and earned a sociology diploma from Loyola College in Trivandrum. He received his doctorate in dogmatic theology (also known as ecclesiology) from the Pontifical Urban University in Rome. He has worked for the archdiocese in a number of positions, including assistant priest, executive secretary of ecumenism and dialogue, parish priest at Pettah, Thope, and St. Augustine Church, Murukumpuzha. Other responsibilities included serving as the executive secretary of Basic Christian Communities, the rector of St. Vincent's Minor Seminary and editor of the diocesan journal Jeevanum Velichavum.
Thomas Jessayyan Netto was appointed as the Archbishop of Trivandrum by Pope Francis on 2 February 2022.
He was consecrated as a bishop on 19 March 2022 and took over from Emeritus Archbishop Rev. Maria Callist Soosa Pakiam as Archbishop of Thiruvananthapuram.

References

1964 births
Living people